Vaipava Nevo Ioane (born 14 April 1988) is a former Samoan weightlifter. He competed in the men's 62 kg event at the 2014 Commonwealth Games where he won a bronze medal.  He represented his country at the 2016 Summer Olympics.

At the 2022 Commonwealth Games in Birmingham he won silver in the 67kg class. He retired after the games.

References

External links
 

1988 births
Living people
Samoan male weightlifters
Commonwealth Games silver medallists for Samoa
Commonwealth Games bronze medallists for Samoa
Commonwealth Games medallists in weightlifting
Weightlifters at the 2016 Summer Olympics
Weightlifters at the 2014 Commonwealth Games
Olympic weightlifters of Samoa
Weightlifters at the 2022 Commonwealth Games
People from Fa'asaleleaga
20th-century Samoan people
21st-century Samoan people
Medallists at the 2014 Commonwealth Games